Hiteswar Saikia (3 October 1936 – 22 April 1996) is an Indian politician who served as the 10th chief minister of Assam for two terms, first from 28 February 1983 to 23 December 1985 and then from 30 June 1991 to 22 April 1996.He is the 1st Governor of Mizoram from 1987 to 1989 and the 6th Lieutenant Governor of Mizoram from 1986 to 1987.He was the education minister in the Government of Assam from and from 1980 to 1981 and again from 1982 to 1982.He was the Minister of State for Home, Education And public relations from from 1972 to 1974 and the minister of Home from from 1974 to 1978.He represents the Nazira constituency in the Assam Legislative Assembly from 1972 to 1988 and again from 1991 to 1996.

Family and education
Hiteswar Saikia was born on 3 October 1936 at Bogabagh Tea Estate to Haladhar Saikia (1896-1988) in a Ahom family. His sister Aimoni married Membor Gogoi who served as Member of Assam Legislative Assembly for Teok.

From his childhood, Saikia was drawn to the non-cooperative movement launched by Mahatma Gandhi. To join the movement he gave up going to school. At that time, he was studying in Class IX only. His father influenced his career at almost all the turning points of his early life. It was his father who made him go to Lucknow for postgraduate studies where he earned an M.A. in History.

As a result of his father's matchmaking, Saikia married Hemoprabha, who succeeded Saikia as MLA of Nazira and became a minister in the First Tarun Gogoi cabinet. His eldest son Debabrata Saikia came into the politics in 2011 and is the current leader of the opposition in Assam Legislative Assembly.

Early political career
Although Hiteswar Saikia was not in the front rank of the leadership when Assam had been swept by the tides of two big political movements, namely The Oil Refinery movement of 1958 and The State Language movement, by dint of his organising capacity he caught the attention of discerning eyes. Saikia joined the ‘All India Congress Committee’ on 15 August 1964.

At that time, the responsibility of leading its youth wing was foisted upon him. He became a very popular figure and contested the Assembly election from his home constituency at Nazira, a small township situated near the ancient capital of the Ahom kings at Gargaon in the district of Sivasagar, Assam.

When he was elected, he was included in the newly formed Sarat Chandra Sinha Ministry. He was given a junior rank as a minister of state and was given the three portfolios of Home, Education and Public relations in 1972.

In 1974 the Chief Minister, Mr. Sarat Chandra Sinha upgraded him to a full scale minister of Cabinet rank with the all-important Home portfolio entrusted to him. This was a turning point in his career. While he was still the Vice Principal of the college where he had taught History, he thrice was to hold the education portfolio: under the chief minister of Sarat Chandra Sinha, it was from May 1972 to March 1974; under a stop-gap Chief Minister, Syeda Anwara Taimur from December 1980 to June 1981 and under yet another stop-gap Chief Minister, Keshab Gogoi, between January and March 1982.

Just a few months before the withdrawal of the President's rule in Assam, Saikia parted ways with Sarat Chandra Sinha and he joined Congress (I) in 1980. Saikia was sounded out as to his taking the leadership of the party on several occasions and declined. Saikia's political maturity and organising ability eventually caught the eye of Indira Gandhi. When the expiry date of President's rule was approaching, a constitutional crisis appeared on Assam's political horizon. Indira Gandhi came to Assam to study the whole situation occurring.

Projects
During the Ministry of Keshab Chandra Gogoi, Saikia was in charge of the Education portfolio. He introduced far reaching changes in Assam's field of education. First he created a separate 'Directorate for Elementary Education'. Secondly, he introduced the idea of what is termed ‘provincialization of high schools’. In the wake of provincialisation, about 2,500 privately run government-aided high schools came under the direct administration of the government, benefitting both students and teachers financially. He made liberal grants available towards the appointment of many teachers in language subjects.

He also made far-reaching changes towards raising the status of police officers and of ordinary constables. He revamped the department, ridding it of the hangovers of the British regime, transforming it into a battalion of uniformed persons who are sentinels of law. He established the Forensic Laboratory at Guwahati, the capital of Assam and set up the ‘single digit fingerprint bureau’. He turned his attention toward bifurcating the Criminal Intelligence Department and creating a Special Branch of it to be run independently. He then improved the functioning of the ‘Assam Police Radio Organization’ by modernising its equipment. Finally, he established a separate training centre for the armed police. But soon some cracks developed in the alliance.

The Assam movement that demanded the expulsion of all foreigners—whose number had been estimated to be several lakhs—gained momentum and the AASU was on the forefront of the movement.  When Saikia came back from Mizoram to play his role in Assam politics, he was picked up as the President of the APCC (I) by Rajiv Gandhi. He meant sending the opposite team of Asom Gana Parishad, which entered into the phase of tail enders’ game. The 1991 general election was the greatest challenge for Saikia's life.

He did everything with concentration on details in respect of every single constituency. From the very first Saikia was sure of annexing the biggest chunk by dint of his holding the winning tricks in his hand. When he got scent of the fact that the main contending party of Congress (I), that is, the AGP would be receiving neither covert nor overt support it expected of the ULFA.

Saikia was doubly sure of the victory of Congress (I). He waited to disclose the anticipation of a resounding victory till the arrival of Rajiv Gandhi who was to visit Assam for releasing the Congress(I) election manifesto. Rajiv Gandhi was fully convinced with the strategies of Saikia and gave him all the responsibility of electioneering in the entire State.

Saikia undertook extensive tour of the villages rather than towns and near cities. He knew that Indian villages represent all important vote banks. After the Assam election and the assassination of Rajiv Gandhi, the election result came out in Assam in favour of Congress. It was all due to the Saikia's ability to retrieve the people's confidence and trust in Congress. He was elected from his home constituency for the fifth consecutive term. When the ULFA kidnapped fourteen top ranking officials serving directly under the Government of Assam and they were taken as hostages by the militant organization (ULFA) which promised to released them in exchanged of the advanced release of a certain number of their comrades-at-arms who had been arrested under Terrorist and Disruptive Activities (Prevention) Act rules during the earlier Army operation known as ‘Operation Bajrang.’

In such a situation, Chief Minister Saikia made an offer of general amnesty and by way of touching wood, he went to the extent of releasing a good number of ULFA detenus against whom there were no specific charges. Meanwhile, Saikia managed to find out some go-between persons who enjoyed the confidence of the ULFA leaders. As behind the scene negotiation went dragging on only to end in hard bargaining.

Chief Minister Saikia took an off the track decision to declare giving effect to the idea of granting general amnesty unilaterally expecting the same to be reciprocated by the ULFA with immediate release of the hostages. He also went on air on 8 July 1991, offering the proposal of holding a meaningful talk with the militant organisation towards a permanent solution of the problem within the framework of the Indian constitution.

However, Prime Minister P. V. Narasimha Rao threw his weight behind Saikia, and he fully endorsed the policy of Saikia, though it differed basically with that of the Govt of Punjab in dealing with a problem similar in nature. The ULFA reciprocated the liberal gesture of the government by releasing most of the hostages but by no means all. The backdrop of the ULFA going increasingly rebellious and people's faith on legally constituted government was getting diminished.

CM Saikia had been compelled to look for measures in both nature and approach. He called for assistance of the Army for the restoration of peace and order in the State. Operation Rhino as this was the second Army operation had been named in contrast with the Operation Bajrang. It succeeded exactly where the earlier operation had failed. It destroyed many training camps, captured still more militant soldiers and also unearthed great many warehouse of arms and ammunitions.

By the middle of January, 1992, there had been a change of climate in the civic life of Assam. The ULFA came forward with its expressed desired of sitting for discussion towards finding a permanent solution of its grievances within the framework of the Indian constitution. Chief Minister Saikia welcomed the change of mood and responded to it richly. At the same time he assured giving appropriate living avenues to those militants who would be coming forward to surrender themselves. The arms and ammunitions in their possession.

Everyone felt to the bones that peace and security have returned to the State. Everyone acknowledge the spirit of tolerance and forgiveness displayed by Chief Minister Saikia in bringing round most of the ULFA militants to the path of sanity. However, certain other parts of Assam began to feel the impact of violence by some other group of terrorists.

The leadership was jointly shared by the ABSU and BPAC groups. But, all of a sudden, BSF came to the forefront whose aim was to achieve an independent Bodoland. BSF believing in armed struggle than anything else. He solved the problem which may be identified as the problem of mini-India everywhere in the country. The Bodo's celebrated the occasion with great jubilation.

Turning his attention to the need of streamlining his liaison wing with persons of proven ability and incorruptible integrity, before whom he can unbag his hunches and premonitions. Drafting the service of Robin Choudhury, who was his Press and Publicity Adviser. Within three months of the Saikia Government's coming to power, a consistently descending curve in the State's crime rate with reference to political murder became visible.

To Saikia, repentance is everything. Assam's economy is dependent on keeping the three resource oriented industries on the even keel. These three industries are always referred to in terms of gold, that is green gold (tea), liquid gold (petroleum) and black gold (coal). Saikia took steps towards getting the business in the form of auction market opened at Guwahati. The fourth Oil Refinery in Assam that was in Numaligarh which was taken up by Saikia.

He invited the Prime Minister to lay the foundation stone of the Numaligarh refinery on 3 July 1992. Chief Minister Saikia offering the argument of the necessity of opening up of two Universities simultaneously at Tezpur and Silchar. He went to Delhi and returned with the approval and necessary sanction for starting both the two universities. He is every inch of practical politician to the last tip of his fingers.

Chief Ministership of Assam
In 1983 Saikia became Chief Minister for the first time as opposition boycotted the polls. The Congress Legislature Party elected Hiteswar Saikia as the leader of the party. The Governor of Assam asked him to form his government. After the swearing-in ceremony, Saikia refrained from performing the normally seen activity of going for allotting the chambers to his ministers. He made them meet together and apportioned duties to all the ministers for going to various troubled areas towards personally supervising relief operations assessing the situations thereat.

Assam was having a political climate which appeared to be different from that of the heart land of India. Then Indira Gandhi observed that only hope lay in bringing the AASU leadership to the negotiating table. She felt that Saikia was the man who could fulfill the task at any cost. Saikia drew up a blue print of his own guidance and for his ministerial colleagues to take the necessary cue.

The meaning of such a blue print: to control the law and order situation which had been on the fringe of anarchy, to contain the communal and ethnic violence, to provide immediate relief and succour to the victims of senseless violence, to manoeuvre the AASU leaders back to the negotiating table, and also to inspire confidence among the sections of people keeping themselves at a distance of the agitationists.

The measure of Saikia's success in the matter may be obtained from the spontaneous words of appreciation in the speech of Prime Minister herself. Then, Prime Minister Rajiv Gandhi came forward to fulfill the half-finished work of his mother. Turning his attention to the problems relating to the Assam movement, he tried bringing the AASU leaders to the negotiating table. To make everything fruitful, Saikia tried at his best. Hence his steps and attitudes enabled Rajiv Gandhi to get the Assam Accord signed by the AASU at midnight on the eve of 15 August 1985. It drew the final curtain over the last scene of the long six years Assam movement.

At that time it was detected in a medical check-up that, both his kidneys were damaged and he was advised to obtain a kidney transplantation. Finally, in the Brigham Women Hospital in the US, he got it done by the best expert in the field at that time on 25 June 1981.

It was his youngest brother who donated one of his kidneys for the purpose. He returned home in October, 1981. After that he joined the Kesab Chandra Gogoi ministry in the early part of 1982. As the Kesab Chandra Gogoi ministry collapsed no sooner than had it been formed and he made all his promises to be done.

He allegedly orchestrated a number of "surrenders" of ULFA operatives.

Governorship of Mizoram
Attaining success in Assam by getting the Assam Accord signed, Prime Minister Rajiv Gandhi turned his attention to Mizoram which had similar problems to that of Assam both in dimension and in nature. Government of India had been tired of facing violence in that Union Territory as unleashed by Laldenga, the leader of the Mizo National Front (MNF) for quite a number of years.

Encouraged by the signing of the Assam Accord, Rajiv Gandhi aimed to sign a similar Mizo Accord. Saikia was appointed the Lt. Governor of Mizoram. In the Indian setting, to ask an ex-Chief Minister becoming a Governor means going on retirement. But they were yet to know that Saikia took it to go on hibernation.

He was to work in unison with two definite targets fixed by the Mizo Accord. First, he must bring peace to that troubled region. Second, he had to fulfill the dream of Mizo people to gain for their territory status of a full scale statehood. He did achieve both in no time. He renewed confidence on himself. Mizoram had a new leaf, no longer it was to remain with a frightening description for itself as the exotic land of mountain and militants. Saikia was the man who discovered the actual grievances of the Mizo's.

Once the proper wavelength was found out the communication became easy and the solution too. When the Prime Minister himself came to Aizawl on 19 February and declared Statehood being granted to Mizoram, as token of which the Lt. Governor was elevated to the rank of the Governor. The whole of the Mizoram went in a great merriment.

When a popular government was installed in Mizoram, Governor Saikia found sometime to move in both inside and outside of the state. At the meanwhile he received an invitation from the Principal of St. Edmund's College at Shillong on the occasion of Golden Jubilee celebration of the college. During the visit to the Don Bosco School at Shillong on 5 July 1987 Saikia took keen interest in vocational training classes.

After the long stay at Mizoram, Saikia acquired a new virtue of his character. When his resigning letter was accepted, people of Mizoram bid him a hearty farewell.

Award and recognition
Saikia went on facing all the problems for the solution of which he had to depend on his own resources of intelligence during his Chief Ministership. All his labour brought forth certain recognition on the national level. In an editorial of the Times of India (15.7.83), Saikia was highly appreciated. There were many others who echoed the feeling about his achievements.

Controversy regarding Manmohan Singh's residence in Saikia House
Hiteswar was a close friend and associate of Dr Manmohan Singh, the Prime Minister of India. In fact, Manmohan Singh became a Rajya Sabha MP from Assam quota by claiming that he was a resident of Assam by producing a house rent receipt from Saikia's wife Smt. Hemoprabha Saikia. According to an affidavit submitted by Manmohan Singh, the prime minister stays in Saikia's rented house at Sarumotoria by paying a monthly rent of Rupees 700. Manmohan Singh could become a Rajya Sabha member, and thereby a prime minister, chiefly by falsely claiming that he was a resident of Hiteswar Saikia's house in Guwahati.

Death
As his transplanted kidney is failing fast, his recurrent fever refused to go and he was finding more difficulty in breathing. Doctors insisted to take rest but Saikia refused and continuing on his post-political career until his untimely demise on 22 April 1996, at the age of 60 years. On the day of his funeral, a Phuraluong Lue Dam worship rite of the Ahom religion was performed by Nagen Hazarika with other Mo'-Luongs or religious priests.

References

1996 deaths
Deaths from kidney failure
1936 births
Cotton College, Guwahati alumni
Chief Ministers of Assam
Chief ministers from Indian National Congress
People from Sivasagar district
Governors of Mizoram
Assam MLAs 1967–1972
Assam MLAs 1972–1978
Assam MLAs 1978–1983
Assam MLAs 1983–1985